OUATIM can refer to:

Once Upon a Time in Mexico, 2003 American film.
Once Upon a Time in Mumbaai, 2010 Indian film.
Once Upon ay Time in Mumbai Dobaara!, 2013 Indian film.